Supersonic and Demonic Relics is the fourth compilation album by Mötley Crüe. It was released in 1999 on Mötley Records. The album is a collection of unreleased tracks as well as rare material, including songs from the limited edition "Quaternary" EP, the greatest hits compilation Decade of Decadence, as well as demos and live versions.

Background
The compilation features the songs "Primal Scream", "Angela" and "Anarchy in the U.K.", which were all originally recorded specifically for the group's first compilation album Decade of Decadence in 1991. Three tracks from the "Quaternary" EP are also included.

The cover song "Teaser", which was first released on the Make a Difference Foundation's Stairway To Heaven/Highway To Hell compilation in 1989 & also featured on Decade of Decadence, was released as a single for this album and charted at number 35 on the Mainstream rock charts.

Track listing

References

Mötley Crüe compilation albums
1999 compilation albums
B-side compilation albums